Tetris Ultimate is a puzzle video game developed by American studio SoMa Play and published by Ubisoft. Ubisoft partnered with The Tetris Company to develop the game to celebrate the 30th anniversary of the Tetris franchise.

Gameplay 
Tetris Ultimate on Nintendo 3DS features seven modes, including a new single-player Challenge mode. Other versions offer six different game modes.

Release
Tetris Ultimate was first released in November 2014 for the Nintendo 3DS as retail game and as digital download in the Nintendo 3DS eShop. In December 2014, the game became available as a digital download for Xbox One and PlayStation 4. In 2015, the game was released for PlayStation Vita.

Because of the release of Tetris Ultimate, Electronic Arts removed the PlayStation 3 and PlayStation Portable versions of Tetris from the PlayStation Store in January 2014, while Nintendo removed the 1989 Game Boy version of Tetris and the digital download of the 2011 game Tetris: Axis from the Nintendo 3DS eShop in December 2014. From January 2014 to February 2019, Ubisoft held the license rights for the PlayStation 4, Xbox One, Nintendo 3DS, PS Vita, and PC downloadable versions of Tetris.

, Tetris Ultimate has been delisted on all platforms and neither the game or its DLC are available digitally.

Reception 

Critical response to Tetris Ultimate was mixed. GameSpot gave the game a 7/10, praising it for being a good version of Tetris, as well as the extensive customization options, stating "If all you want is a good version of classic Tetris for your new console, this one will suit your needs well". However, he also criticized the bugginess of the online play and the lack of innovation or new modes. The PlayStation 4 and Xbox One versions were also criticized for the multitude of issues in the online modes.

References

External links 
 

2014 video games
Ubisoft games
Multiplayer and single-player video games
Nintendo 3DS games
Nintendo 3DS eShop games
Nintendo Network games
PlayStation 4 games
PlayStation Network games
PlayStation Vita games
Tetris
Video games developed in the United States
Windows games
Xbox One games